Leeanna Walsman  is an Australian actress. She is perhaps best known for her role as Zam Wesell in Star Wars: Episode II – Attack of the Clones (2002), for playing Carly Bishop in the Australian film Looking for Alibrandi (2000), for her role as Erica Davidson in the Australian television series Wentworth, and for her starring role in the mini-series Jessica. Walsman also starred in Home and Away: An Eye for an Eye (2015), which aired on subscription channel Presto.

In 2012 Walsman joined the cast of Australian Prison drama Wentworth as Erica Davidson, the role which was originally played by Patsy King in Prisoner. Leeanna would appear in the entire first season of the series, leaving at the end of season 1 to pursue other opportunities.

Walsman maintained a steady stream of work filming Penguin Bloom, 2067, Bosch and Rockit and reprising her voice for Lego Star Wars The Skywalker Saga.

Walsman joined the cast of upcoming Channel Nine crime drama Human Error in the lead role of Holly O'Rourke.

Early life
Born in Sydney, Australia. Her parents are Bob and Elaine Walsman, plus an older brother named David. Leeanna attended Riverside Girls High School in Sydney, but quit school when she was 16 to focus on acting.

Awards
In 2005, she was nominated for the Logie Award for Most Outstanding Actress in a Drama Series for her work on Jessica, losing to Miranda Otto. She has also been nominated for two AFI Awards and an IF Award.

Filmography

Film

Television

Video games

References

External links 
 

1979 births
Actresses from Sydney
Australian film actresses
Australian stage actresses
Australian television actresses
Living people
20th-century Australian actresses
21st-century Australian actresses